George Johnston Allman (28 September 1824 – 9 May 1904) was an Irish professor, mathematician, classical scholar, and historian of ancient Greek mathematics. His fame rests mainly upon his authorship of Greek Geometry from Thales to Euclid, first published in Dublin in 1889, and republished several times subsequently.

Life
He was born in Dublin the son of William Allman MD, also a botanist.

He held the position of Professor of Mathematics at Queen's University of Ireland for forty years, from 1853 until reaching retirement age in 1893.

He died at Finglass, Dublin on 9 May, 1904. He had married in 1853 Louisa, the daughter of John Smith Taylor of Dublin.

Recognition
He was elected a Fellow of the Royal Society in June, 1884. His candidacy citation read: "Member of the Senate of the Queen's University of Ireland, – Appointed by Charter one of the original Senators of the Royal University of Ireland – Member of Standing Committee of the said University. Author of the following papers, amongst others: "Method of deriving the Polar Equations of Dynamics & Hydrodynamics from direct physical considerations" – Dublin University Phil Transactions 1848. "On certain Curves traced on the Surface of an Ellipsoid", Camb & Dub Math Journal. 1848. "On the Attraction of Ellipsoids, with a new demonstration of Clairaut's Theorem, being an account of the late Prof MacCullagh's lectures", Trans RI Academy 1855. "On some properties of Paraboloids". Quarterly Journal Maths 1874. "Greek Geometry from Thales to Euclid, Part 1" Hermathena 1877. Do "Part 2" Hermathena, 1881"

References

External links

About George Johnston Allman

1824 births
1904 deaths
19th-century British mathematicians
British classical scholars
Historians of mathematics
Alumni of Trinity College Dublin
Fellows of the Royal Society